Margaret Wild (born 1948) is an Australian children's writer. She has written more than 40 books for children. Her work has been published around the world and has won several awards. She was awarded the Lifetime Achievement Award by the Children's Book Council of Australia in 2022.

Life
Wild was born in Eshowe, South Africa, an early European settlement now a market town. Her bank manager's family moved frequently and she attended state schools in Johannesburg. She came to Australia in 1972, worked as a magazine feature writer, and finished her education at Australian National University in Canberra. In Sydney she raised a family, worked as a freelance writer, worked sixteen years as a book editor in children's publishing—1984 to 2000, finally at ABC Books, Australian Broadcasting Corporation.

Writer
Wild's books explore a diverse range of themes but she is particularly noted for exploring issues of identity, trust, and death. Let the Celebrations Begin (1991) focused on the imminent release of Jewish prisoners from a Nazi concentration camp, while in The Very Best of Friends (1989) the death of a farmer prompts his widowed wife to find the love to care for their respective pets, a cat and dog, equally. Fox (2000), illustrated by Ron Brooks using the colours of the Australian landscape, is a powerful story about trust and betrayal.

Recently Wild has published two verse novels, One Night and Jinx. These books investigate the trials and anxieties faced by teenagers coping with school, relationships and growing up.

In March 2020 Wild was awarded an award for Lifetime Achievement in Literature by the Australia Council. In December 2020 she was nominated as Australia's author candidate for the 2022 Hans Christian Andersen Award.

She now lives in Sydney.

Works

Picture books
 Chalk Boy, illustrated by Mandy Ord (2018)
 The Sloth that came to Stay, illustrated by Vivienne To (2017)
 Bogtrotter, illustrated by Judith Rossell (2015)
 The Bush book Club, illustrated by Ben Wood (2014)
 The Treasure Box, ill. Freya Blackwood (2013)
 Tanglewood, ill. Vivienne Goodman (2012)
 Vampyre, ill. Andrew Yeo (2011)
 Puffling, ill. Julie Vivas (2009)
 Harry & Hopper, ill. Freya Blackwood (2009)
 The Pocket dogs go on holiday, ill. Stephen Michael King (2008)
 Piglet and Papa, ill. Stephen Michael King (2007)
 Woolvs in the Sitee, ill Anne Spudvilas (2006)
 Chatterbox, ill. Deborah Niland (2006)
 The Bilbies of Bliss, ill. Noela Young (2005)
 The Little Crooked House, co-written with illustrator Jonathan Bentley (2005)
 Hop, Little Hare!, ill. Peter Shaw (2005)
 Piglet and Mama, ill. Stephen Michael King (2005)
 Farmer Fred's Cow, ill. David Waller (2004)
 Seven More Sleeps, ill. Donna Rawlins (2004)
 Kiss, Kiss!, ill. Bridget Strevens-Marzo (2003)
 Little Humpty, ill. Ann James (2003)
 Baby Boomsticks, ill. David Legge (2003)
 Mr Moo, ill. Jonathon Bentley (2002)
 Jenny Angel, ill. Anne Spudvilas (2002)
 The House of Narcissus, ill. Wayne Harris (2001)
 The Pocket Dogs, ill. Stephen Michael King (2001)
 The Midnight Feast, ill. Ann James (2001)
 Midnight Babies, ill. Ann James (2001)
 Nighty Night!, ill. Kerry Argent (2001)
 Fox, ill. Ron Brooks (2000)
 Tom Goes to Kindergarten, ill. David Legge (2000)
 Miss Lily's Fabulous Pink Feather Boa, ill. Kerry Argent (1999)
 Old Pig, co-written with illustrator Ron Brooks (1999)
 Our Granny, ill. Julie Vivas (1998)
 Rosie and Tortoise, ill. Ron Brooks (1998)
 First Day, ill. by Kim Gamble (1998)
 Bim Bam Boom!, ill. Wayne Harris (1998)
 Big Cat Dreaming, ill. Anne Spudvilas (1997)
 The Midnight Gang, ill. Ann James (1997)
 Remember Me, ill. Dee Huxley (1995)
 Beast, (1995)
 Mr. Nick's Knitting, ill. Dee Huxley (1994)
 Going Home, ill. Wayne Harris (1994)
 Toby, ill. Noela Young (1994)
 The Slumber Party, ill. David Cox (1993)
 But Granny Did, ill. Ian Forss (1993)
 Space Travellers, ill. Gregory Rogers (1993)
 All the Better to See You With!, ill. Pat Reynolds (1993)
 Thank You, Santa, ill. Kerry Argent (1992)
 My Dearest Dinosaur, ill. Donna Rawlins (1992)
 Let the Celebrations Begin!, ill. Julie Vivas (1991)
 The Very Best of Friends, ill. Julie Vivas (1990)
 Kathy's Umbrella, ill. Hannah Koch (1987)
 There's a Sea in My Bedroom, ill. Jane Tanner (1984)
 Something Absolutely Enormous, ill. Jack Hannah (1984)

Novels
 One Night (2006)
 Jinx (2004)
 Beast (1997)
 Diary of Megan Moon (1988)
 Grumpy Bunny (2003)

Awards

Personal 
 Won – Nan Chauncy Award (2008)
 Won – Lifetime Achievement Award, Children's Book Council of Australia (2022)

For books 
There's a Sea in My Bedroom

 Shortlisted –  CBCA Children's Book of the Year Award: Picture Book (1985)
 Shortlisted – Kate Greenaway Award (UK) (1985)

The Very Best of Friends
 Won – CBCA Children's Book of the Year Award: Picture Book (1990)

The Midnight Gang
 Won – Books I Love Best Yearly: Early Readers Award (1998)

Miss Lily's Fabulous Pink Feather Boa
 Shortlisted – Young Australian Best Book Award: Picture Book (1999)

Jenny Angel
 Shortlisted – Family Award for Children's Books: Picture Book (1999)
 Shortlisted – Australian Publishers Association: Design (1999)
 Shortlisted – New South Wales State Literary Award: Young Reader (2000)
 Won – CBCA Children's Book of the Year Award: Picture Book (2000)
 Shortlisted – Young Australian Best Book Award: Picture Book (2001)

The Pocket Dogs
 Shortlisted – CBCA Children's Book of the Year Award: Early Childhood (2001)
 Shortlisted – Young Australian Best Book Award: Picture Book (2003)
 Shortlisted BILBY Award#Early Readers Award#Books I Love Best Yearly: Early Readers Award (2003)

Fox
 Won – CBCA Children's Book of the Year Award: Picture Book (2001)
 Won Queensland Premier's Literary Awards: Children's Book Award (2001)
 Won – Deutscher Jugendliteraturpreis (2004)

Baby Boomsticks
 Won – Books I Love Best Yearly: Early Readers Award (2006)

Woolvs in the Sitee
 Won – Aurealis Award for Best Children's Fiction (2006)
 Shortlisted – CBCA Children's Book of the Year Award: Picture Book (2007)
 Shortlisted – ABPA Book Design Awards: Picture Book (2007)

Chatterbox
 Shortlisted – CBCA Children's Book of the Year Award: Early Childhood (2007)

References

External links

 Margaret Wild at publisher Allen & Unwin
 Margaret Wild at publisher Penguin Books Australia
 ; search parent Hardie Grant
 Margaret Wild at publisher Walker Books Australia
 Wild at Libraries Australia Authorities, with catalogue search  
 July 2014: The primary Note is copied from this page, August 2007 to June 2014.
  (1984–present)

1948 births
Living people
Australian children's writers
Writers from Sydney
South African emigrants to Australia
South African women writers
Australian women children's writers